From the Ground Up is an acoustic EP by Collective Soul, released on May 24, 2005. The EP peaked #129 on the Billboard 200. There is a hidden track after Satellite that plays at 4:15, about a minute after the song finishes.

Track listing
All songs written by Ed Roland, except where noted.

"Compliment" (Ed Roland, Dean Roland) – 3:00
"Youth" – 2:56
"December" – 3:29
"Perfect to Stay" – 3:25
"Under Heaven's Skies" – 4:01
"She Said" – 4:43
"Counting the Days" – 3:21
"Satellite" – 6:52
"Now You've Got Me Drinkin'" (hidden track) – 2:37

2005 EPs
Collective Soul albums
Self-released EPs